Praktikertjänst Aktiebolag is a Swedish company, specialising in health and dental care.

The business idea has a cooperative framework, which means that every individual who wants to purchase shares in the company has to be the head of a clinic in the concern. Most of the administration and quality assurance, support and advisory is done centrally, whilst the health care service is done in the local clinics.

Praktikertjänst is the biggest private health and dental care company in Sweden; it has a turnover of 9.97 billion Swedish kronor and 9,269 employees.

References

External links
Official home page

Health care companies of Sweden
Companies based in Stockholm